Jean-Pierre Lucas Housse (24 February 1871 – 18 May 1930), known as Luc Housse, was a Luxembourgish politician that served as Mayor of Luxembourg City between 1918 and 1920.  During his stint as mayor, the commune of Luxembourg was expanded to include the former communes of Eich, Hamm, Hollerich, and Rollingergrund, which now form the majority of its suburbs.

There is a street in Cessange, Luxembourg City, named after Housse (Rue Luc Housse).

Mayors of Luxembourg City
Luxembourgian jurists
Luxembourgian people of World War I
Luxembourgian socialists
1871 births
1930 deaths